DR Congo national football team (formerly the Zaire national football team) have appeared in the finals of the FIFA World Cup on one occasion in 1974 when they were known as Zaire. They were the first Sub-Saharan African team to participate in a World Cup Finals. Despite respectable performances against Scotland and Brazil they were defeated in all three matches with a total goal difference of 0–14.

Context

In the late 1960s and early 1970s, Zairian dictator Mobutu Sese Seko invested heavily in the national football team. It led to continental success, with Zaire winning the African Cup of Nations in 1968 and in March 1974, just three months before their World Cup appearance. After qualifying for the 1974 FIFA World Cup in December 1973, the players were each given a car and a house by Mobutu.

The disastrous displays of the Zaire national team were put into a new light in a notable 2002 interview with defender Mwepu Ilunga. According to him, they were informed they would not be paid after their initial 0-2 defeat against Scotland. This led to the Zairian players refusing to play. Even though they were persuaded to show up against Yugoslavia, they were unmotivated and lost 0-9, one of the highest defeats in FIFA World Cup history.

"After the match, he (Mobutu) sent his presidential guards to threaten us. They closed the hotel to all journalists and said that if we lost 0-4 to Brazil, none of us would be able to return home", Ilunga is quoted.

They lost their final match 0–3.

In an interview in 2018, the captain Raoul Kidumu affirmed the reason for the defeat against Yugoslavia.

"We were aware that every team received a big qualification bonus [From FIFA, and partially passed on to the players] of half a million dollars. That was our money. We'd been asking for days. We shared the same hotel with the players of Haiti and every day we saw them arrive back with bags full of presents: jewellery, radios, clothes. Bought with their bonus. Meanwhile our Minister of Sport was running around with his bum bag. He was arranging the financial matters with FIFA. On the eve of the game with Yugoslavia he called us together for a meeting. We thought: "Finally!" Until he said he had to share something with us. "Regarding the money, it'll be sent straight to Zaire." That's when we knew we wouldn't see a penny of it. All the players were angry, including myself. We wouldn't play against Yugoslavia. A team at the world championships had never forfeited before. We were determined to be the first."

Of course this angered the dictator Mubutu and half an hour later a further team meeting was called. The president was on the line and Kidumu as the team captain had to pick up the phone. "The president was angry. A strike? He said he would be watching the match the next day on TV. He told me he would be watching whether or not we entered the pitch. It sounded like a threat so we gave in. We were afraid of the consequences. Not even for ourselves, but our families back in Zaire. SO we showed up for the match. But you have to understand that our morale was gone."

The captain also affirmed the threats made by the president about losing the next match against Brazil by more than 3 goals. “We started the match with the intention to show the world we could play football. At half time it was only 1–0. But the coach deceived everyone. Together with the goal keeper he falsified the game. Kazadi, our goalkeeper, later confessed it. Brazil had to win by at least three goals to qualify and they arranged it. You should rewatch those last two goals. A blind wench could have stopped those balls."

The Free Kick Incident

Late in their third match, a free kick was given to Zairian opponents Brazil at a central position just outside the penalty box. Before Brazil's free kick specialist Rivelino could take it, however, Zaire defender Mwepu Ilunga darted out of the defending wall and kicked the ball away as hard as he could. At the time,  some thought of it as "a bizarre moment of African innocence" as quoted by BBC reporter John Motson. Ever since, it is regularly listed among the most hilarious and memorable moments of World Cup history.

Only decades later did Ilunga explain that he was fully aware of the rules and had hoped to be sent off in an act of protest, but referee Nicolae Rainea only showed him a yellow card.

Aftermath

The Yugoslav coach Vidinić did not return to Zaire after the championships but went straight back to his home country.

The players, rather than being received by luxurious coach as had been the case after their Africa Cup triumph, had an empty army truck waiting for them. They were driven straight to the presidential palace, where Mobutu was waiting for them.

The captain said "There he gave us an ear full. He looked at us over the rim of his glasses, like an angry dad to his children: "So you thought you would rebel? I gave you all a house and a car!". He was furious. Not one player dared to speak. It was deathly quiet. In the end I softly asked to have the word and I apologised for what happened. It's the only thing I could have done. He finished with "Next time I'll throw you all in jail.""

As punishment none of the players could leave the country. A list in the port and the airport of their names was displayed with "Forbidden to leave the country". This scuppered the players prospects of moves to European clubs with the offers that came in after the World cup.

After the World cup Mobutu lost interest in football and stopped actively using the national team as a political tool for promoting his regime. One of the players ended up being homeless. In 2012 a charity raised money for the surviving players to receive a small pension every month of a couple of hundred dollars.

Record at the FIFA World Cup

*Draws include knockout matches decided via penalty shoot-out

By Match

Record by Opponent

Zaire at West Germany 1974

Squad

Head coach:  Blagoje Vidinić

Group 2

Yugoslavia beat Brazil, who in turn beat Scotland, by better goal difference

Record players
Ten players were fielded by head coach Vidinić on all three occasions, making them record players for the DR Congo to this day.

References

 
Countries at the FIFA World Cup
World Cup